Longomel is a village and a civil parish of the municipality of Ponte de Sor, Portugal. The population in 2011 was 1,228, in an area of 46.19 km2.

References

Freguesias of Ponte de Sor